The 1896 United States presidential election in North Carolina took place on November 3, 1896. All contemporary 45 states were part of the 1896 United States presidential election. North Carolina voters chose 11 electors to the Electoral College, which selected the president and vice president.

North Carolina was won by the Democratic nominees, former U.S. Representative William Jennings Bryan of Nebraska and his running mate Arthur Sewall of Maine. 5 electors cast their vice presidential ballots for Thomas E. Watson, who was nominated as Bryan's running mate under the Populist Party banner in a form of fusion, at the same time as the Populists were engaging in fusion with the North Carolina Republicans at the state level (both fusion efforts being orchestrated by Marion Butler.)

As of the 2020 presidential election, this is the last occasion Northampton County has voted for a Republican presidential candidate, which stands as the second-longest Democratic streak in the nation. While Northampton County had been majority Black and a Republican bastion since the Civil War, the 1899 disenfranchisement of Black voters by North Carolina Democrats following their White supremacy campaign of 1898 prevented Republicans from winning the county until long after political realignment had occurred.

Results

Results by county

Notes

References

North Carolina
1896
1896 North Carolina elections